Aivars Aksenoks (born 24 May 1961) is a Latvian politician. A founder of the right-wing New Era, Aksenoks has a degree in engineering from the Riga Technical University and was the director of State Road and Traffic Safety Agency from 1992–2002. He was also the Minister of Justice, serving from 2003–2004. However, he is best known for being the mayor of Riga from 29 March 2005 to 19 February 2007.

He moved from JL to For Fatherland and Freedom/LNNK in 2008. Since 2009, Aksenoks is director of the Riga Motor Museum.

References

1961 births
Living people
Politicians from Riga
New Era Party politicians
For Fatherland and Freedom/LNNK politicians
National Alliance (Latvia) politicians
Ministers of Justice of Latvia
Mayors of Riga
Museum directors
Riga State Gymnasium No.1 alumni
Riga Technical University alumni
Recipients of the Order of the Cross of Terra Mariana, 3rd Class